National Route 401 is a national highway of Japan connecting Aizuwakamatsu, Fukushima and Numata, Gunma in Japan, with a total length of 171.1 km (106.32 mi).

Route description
A section of National Route 401 in the village of Katashina in Gunma Prefecture is a musical road.

References

National highways in Japan
Roads in Fukushima Prefecture
Roads in Gunma Prefecture
Musical roads in Japan